Northumberland College is a further education college based in Ashington, Northumberland, England. The present site opened in 1957, and became the County Technical College in 1961, transformed again in 1987, becoming the Northumberland College of Arts and Technology, and finally settled upon its current status in 1995.

It has a main campus in Ashington in the south east of the County and additional centres at Kirkley Hall, Hexham and Berwick.

The college offers outreach courses from a number of smaller community venues and employability courses in community venues.

Northumberland College provides further education courses to school leavers and adult learners in a wide range of subjects, including Access and Education; Art, Design and Interactive Media; Business and Administration; Construction; Early Years; Engineering; Functional Skills; Foundation Learning; Hairdressing and Beauty Therapy; Health and Social Care; Hospitality and Catering; Information Technology; Land Based Industries; Renewable Energies; Sport and Leisure and Travel and Tourism.  A recent development is a new course in Music Production.

Higher Education courses are also available. There are Foundation Degrees in Horticulture, Agriculture, Arboriculture,  Environmental Conservation, Animal Management, Equine Studies and Children's Workforce Practice as well as Higher National Diplomas in Travel and Tourism, Hospitality, Engineering, Textile Studies, Photography and IT.

A wide range of apprenticeships are available in Business Administration, IT, Engineering, Construction, Horticulture, Hospitality, Health and Social Care and Early Years.

Northumberland College merged with Sunderland College and Hartlepool Sixth Form in 2019 to create Education Partnership North East.

Gary Potts is the current principal.

References

External links

 Official website

Education in Northumberland
Further education colleges in Northumberland
Educational institutions established in 1995
Ashington
1995 establishments in England